The four-toed jerboa (Scarturus tetradactyla) is a rodent of the family Dipodidae and genus Scarturus that has four digits. Four-toed jerboas  are native to Egypt and Libya. They live in coastal salt marshes and dry deserts.

Physical appearance
Similar to the other jerboas in the genera Allactaga and Scarturus, the four-toed jerboa are small hopping rodents with large ears and a long tail, with a black band near the white, feathery tip. The tail assists and serves as support when the jerboa is standing upright. They have long hind feet and short forelegs. The pelt of the four-toed jerboa is velvety in texture and the upper-parts are speckled black and orange, the rump orange, and the sides gray. The four-toed jerboa hind-limbs have an extra digit compared to other jerboas in the genus Allactaga. The extra digit is smaller in size and nonfunctional compared to the other three digits.

Nutrition
Emerging at night, the four-toed jerboa eats grass, leaves, and soft seeds. The low crown molars and soft palates help the four-toed jerboa chew plant material and seeds.

The four-toed jerboa is a host of the Acanthocephalan intestinal parasite Moniliformis aegyptiacus.

Conservation status
The four-toed jerboa was listed as an animal on the Endangered Species List by the IUCN Red List. They are facing a very high risk of extinction due to habitat loss and restricted range.

References

Dipodidae
Mammals of the Middle East
Rodents of North Africa
Mammals described in 1823